Evren is a village in Mut district of Mersin Province, Turkey. As of 2012 it had a population of 512 people.

References

Villages in Mut District